Peter John Reynolds (6 November 1939 – 26 September 2001) was a British archaeologist known for his research in experimental archaeology and the British Iron Age. His work as the first director of Butser Ancient Farm, a working replica of an Iron Age farmstead in Hampshire, made a significant contribution to our understanding of the Iron Age, and to the field of experimental archaeology.

Early life
Reynolds was born on 6 November 1939  in Shifnal, Shropshire, England. He was educated at The Priory Grammar School for Boys, Shrewsbury. He read Classics at Trinity College, Dublin, graduating in 1962 with a Double First.  He then studied for a teaching diploma at Reading University.

Career
After completing his teaching diploma, Reynolds became the classics master at Prince Henry's Grammar School, Evesham. Here, he was also a Sixth Form tutor.

Butser Ancient Farm 
In 1972, Reynolds was recruited as the first director of Butser Ancient Farm, an experimental archaeology research site in Hampshire, southern England. The site began as a working Iron Age farm, reconstructing Iron Age roundhouses from UK archaeology to test current theories on Iron Age building techniques, as well as economy and culture. Reynolds' work at Butser established the current understanding of the roundhouse, showing that Iron Age roundhouses did not need a chimney or other hole for smoke to escape through, and disproving prevailing thought at the time. The projects at Butser were instrumental in establishing experimental archaeology as a legitimate archaeological discipline.

In the 50 years since its establishment, hundreds of experiments have been conducted at Butser, covering a wide range of subjects including the construction of houses, the storage of grain, the keeping of livestock, and the production and use of ancient technologies. Today, the site includes buildings from the Stone Age, Bronze Age, Iron Age, and Saxon period, including a replica Roman villa, and continues to run experiments and educate the public.

During his time at Butser, he also appeared on various episodes of the Channel 4 television series Time Team. The 6th episode of Series 9, in which he appeared, is dedicated to him, as he died after filming but before it aired.

Personal life
Reynolds was twice married. He married Bridget in 1976. Together, they had a daughter, Jemma.

Publications
Reynolds was an innovative researcher, who made a major contribution to our understanding of Iron Age life. A full list of his publications can be found at the Butser Archive.

Books

References 

English archaeologists
1939 births
People from Shifnal
2001 deaths
Alumni of Trinity College Dublin
People educated at The Priory Boys' Grammar School, Shrewsbury